The 1972–73 Eredivisie season was the 13th season of the Eredivisie, the top level of ice hockey in the Netherlands. Seven teams participated in the league, and the Tilburg Trappers won the championship.

Regular season

External links
Nederlandse IJshockey Bond

Neth
Eredivisie (ice hockey) seasons